Choi Eun-young is a South Korean-born professional hockey player who participated in the 2006 Women's Hockey World Cup in Madrid, Spain playing for South Korea.

References

Living people
Year of birth missing (living people)
South Korean female field hockey players
Place of birth missing (living people)